The Swinton–Doncaster line is a short railway line in South Yorkshire between Swinton Junction on the Wakefield Line and Doncaster South Yorkshire Junction on the East Coast Main Line. The line comprises the former North Midland Railway's "Swinton curve" between Swinton and Mexborough and the east end of the former South Yorkshire Railway Blackburn Valley line, between Mexborough and Doncaster. Northern operates passenger trains on the line; TransPennine Express, East Midlands Railway, and CrossCountry use the line but do not provide stopping service.

See also 
 North Midland Railway
 South Yorkshire Railway

References

External links 
 

Rail transport in South Yorkshire